Sverre Andersen (21 March 1893 – 14 June 1947) was a Norwegian footballer. He played in two matches for the Norway national football team in 1913 to 1917.

References

External links
 
 

1893 births
1947 deaths
Norwegian footballers
Norway international footballers
Association football forwards
Odds BK players